Rodéo is a 2004 album recorded by French pop singer Zazie. It was her fifth studio album and her seventh album overall. It was released on 22 November 2004 and achieved success in francophone countries. It provided four singles, but all of them were only released as promotional singles and therefore did not chart.

Background and release
For the first time, Zazie co-wrote all the songs on the album with the composers Jean-Pierre Pilot and Philippe Paradis.

The album was recorded at a house in the Luberon in November 2003. It was released in two editions : a standard edition and an edition including a bonus track, "Mon coeur à la science", and a DVD. This DVD contains the music videos for ten songs of the album presented under a 40-minute film entitled "Rodéo indien". As the title indicates it, this film was shot in India, by Didier Le Pêcheur, who had already produced other music videos for Zazie. This DVD is also composed of a making-of and an Indian remixed version of the songs "Tous des anges", "Un point c'est toi" and "Zen".

Chart performance
In France, the album went straight to number two, its peak position, on 21 November 2004. It dropped on the chart and totaled nine weeks, 21 weeks in the top 50 and 70 weeks in the top 200. In Belgium (Wallonia), it debuted at No. 7 on 4 December 2004 and reached a peak of number two for four consecutive weeks. It remained in the top 100 for 45 weeks. In Switzerland, the album was charted for nine weeks and achieved No. 45 in its four weeks, on 26 December 2004.

Track listings

1Tracks 3, 7, 8, 10, and 12 are credited in the order: Zazie, Philippe Paradis, Jean-Pierre Pilot.

Credits and personnel
 Musicians : Angel Luis Cabrera, Philippe Desbois and Bruno Le Roux
 Acoustic guitar and bass : Nicolas Fiszman
 Kalimba : Jean-Pierre Pilot
 Keyboards : Philippe Paradis and Jean-Pierre Pilot
 Guitar  : Philippe Paradis
 Assistant : Ted Hall
 Mixing : Yves Jaget
 Programming : Jean-Pierre Pilot and Philippe Paradis
 Backline technician : Éric Salmon
 Photo and design : Laurent Seroussi

Release history

Charts

Certifications and sales

References

2004 albums
Zazie albums